Thomas Morton (born 1955) is a Scottish broadcaster, journalist, and author. He lives and works mainly in the Shetland Islands.

Life
Morton was born in 1955, and moved to Shetland in 1987 three years after his wife Susan who was a General Practitioner (GP).

Until April 2015, Morton presented a BBC Radio Scotland show, broadcast Friday, Saturday and Sunday nights, from 10:00 pm to 1:00 am, a Scottish take on rock and pop from obscure blues to mainstream pop and soul and current independent releases.

From November 2011 until January 2015 he edited the magazine Shetland Life.

Morton was a co-author with his son James, of their 2016 book Shetland : cooking on the edge of the world.  James is known as a runner up in The Great British Bake Off (series 3) of 2012.

In 2022, Morton was nominated as Scottish Labour's candidate in the local elections to Shetland Islands Council. He was one of three candidates nominated for three vacancies in the Shetland North Ward. As only three candidates stood, Morton became a councillor, unopposed.

Works
Morton's works, which encompass both fiction and non fiction, include:

References

External links
BBC Radio Scotland – Tom Morton
From the Beatcroft, Shetland Isles – Tom Morton's blog

1955 births
Living people
People from Carlisle, Cumbria
Scottish bloggers
Scottish biographers
Scottish evangelicals
Scottish journalists
Scottish writers about music
Scottish public relations people
Scottish radio personalities
Scottish radio presenters
Scottish television presenters
Scottish travel writers
Melody Maker writers
People from Shetland
Shetland music
Scottish comics writers